"Young Boy" is a song by Paul McCartney, included as the fifth track on his 10th studio album, Flaming Pie (1997). McCartney reportedly started working on the song in August 1994. The initial tracks were recorded in February 1995 at Steve Miller's studio in Sun Valley, Idaho, and were completed in May at McCartney's home studio.

On 28 April 1997, the song was released as the first single from Flaming Pie, peaking at  3 in Spain and No. 19 on the UK Singles Chart. The single featured two non-album B-sides: "Looking for You" and "Broomstick". In the United States, Capitol Records chose to issue "The World Tonight" as the album's lead single instead.

Track listings
UK CD1 and Australian CD single 
 "Young Boy" (with Steve Miller) – 3:54
 "Looking for You" (with Ringo Starr and Jeff Lynne) – 4:38
 "Oobu Joobu" (Part 1) – 9:54

UK CD2 
 "Young Boy" (with Steve Miller) – 3:54
 "Broomstick" (with Steve Miller) – 5:09
 "Oobu Joobu" (Part 2) – 10:19

US promo CD 
 "Young Boy" (with Steve Miller) – 3:54

Japanese CD single 
 "Young Boy" (with Steve Miller) – 3:55
 "Looking for You" (with Ringo Starr and Jeff Lynne) – 4:38

"Oobu Joobu"
The "Oobu Joobu" tracks are a series of home demos, interviews, and unreleased songs jumbled together into one track. The name is taken from McCartney's Radio program, Oobu Joobu.
 "Oobu Joobu" (Part 1) contains:
 "Some Folks Say Oobu" – 0:25
 "Oobu Joobu Main Theme" – 0:30
 Fun Packed Radio Show – 0:08
 "I Love This House" – 3:41
 "Clock Work" – 0:04
 Paul talks about "Young Boy" – 3:47
 "Oobu Joobu We Love You" – 0:12
 "Oobu Joobu Main Theme" – 1:06

 "Oobu Joobu" (Part 2) contains:
 Wide Screen Radio – 0:12
 "Oobu Joobu We Love You" – 0:06
 "Oobu Joobu Main Theme" – 0:32
 Brilliant, What's Next – 0:03
 "Atlantic Ocean" – 6:25
 Paul Reminisces – 1:24
 "Bouree" – 0:23
 "Oobu Joobu We Love You" – 0:12
 "Oobu Joobu Main Theme" – 1:03

Personnel
 Paul McCartney – lead vocals, bass guitar, acoustic guitar, hammond organ, drums
 Steve Miller – backing vocals, electric guitar, rhythm guitar

Charts

Weekly charts

Year-end charts

Release history

References

External links
 Information about Young Boy on www.JPGR.co.uk

1997 singles
1997 songs
Capitol Records singles
Music published by MPL Music Publishing
Parlophone singles
Paul McCartney songs
Song recordings produced by Paul McCartney
Songs written by Paul McCartney